The 1982 Arkansas gubernatorial election was held on November 2, 1982. One-term Democratic Governor of Arkansas Bill Clinton regained the position after having narrowly been defeated by Republican Frank D. White at the previous election. Clinton eventually continued to serve this office until he was later elected President in 1992.

Democratic nomination 
 Gov. Bill Clinton, Governor of Arkansas 1979-1981
 Lt. Governor Joe Purcell, former Acting Governor of Arkansas, 1979, former Lieutenant Governor 1975-1981; former Attorney General 1967-1971.
  Jim Guy Tucker, Former Congressman and Attorney General
 Kim Hendren, State Senator and automobile dealer
 Monroe Schwarzlose, Retired turkey farmer and perennial candidate

Republican nomination 
 Frank D. White – Incumbent Governor
 Marshall Chrisman, farmer and former State Representative
 Connie Voll, Nutritionist

Campaign 
Bill Clinton, one of the youngest ex-governors in the nation, at the age of 36, was running to reclaim his political career. Frank White easily won renomination from the Republican party.

White was hurt politically due to several unpopular decisions that he made, and Clinton ran an aggressive campaign.

Result 
Bill Clinton, who was defeated in the last election, won the election, and elected again in 1984, 1986, and 1990, until his presidential victory in November 1992.

References 

Gubernatorial
Arkansas
1982
Bill Clinton